Akram Zaki (27 October 1931 – 30 November 2017) was a Pakistani politician. He held the role of senior leader of the Pakistan Muslim League and chairman of the Senate Standing Committee on Foreign Affairs.

Career
Zaki also served as Pakistani ambassador to China, Nigeria, the Philippines and the United States and remained as secretary general and minister of state for foreign affairs during a long career with the Foreign Service that spanned throughout the reigns of Z. A. Bhutto and General Zia Ul-Haq. He was an active contributor to a number of research and social organizations in Pakistan and represented Pakistan at several national and international conferences including United Nations General Assembly, UN Human Rights Commission, Organization of Islamic Conference, Asian Development Bank and more.

Death
Akram Zaki died on 30 November 2017 at Islamabad, Pakistan.

References

External links

1931 births
2017 deaths
Pakistan Muslim League (N) politicians
Members of the Senate of Pakistan
Ambassadors of Pakistan to China
High Commissioners of Pakistan to Nigeria
Ambassadors of Pakistan to the Philippines
People from Gujranwala